Petr Litvinchuk (born 14 April 1976) is a sport shooter from Belarus.  He was born in Brest, Belarus, and lives in Minsk, Belarus. 

He competed for Belarus in the 2008 Summer Olympics, coming in 17th in the Men's 50m rifle prone.

He shares the world record in the 50 meter rifle prone competition, with a 600 he shot in 2003.

Current world record in 50 m rifle prone

References

External links
the-sports bio

1976 births
Living people
Olympic shooters of Belarus
Shooters at the 2008 Summer Olympics
Belarusian male sport shooters
Sportspeople from Minsk